Center Parcs Europe (formerly Center Parcs) is a European network of holiday villages that was founded in the Netherlands in 1968, and is currently operated by Pierre & Vacances and owned by Blackstone Group.

History
Dutch entrepreneur Piet Derksen started a sporting goods shop in 1953 at Lijnbaan, Rotterdam. Its name was 'Sporthuis Centrum', 'Sport House Centre'. It succeeded and Derksen expanded into 17 outlets across the Netherlands, and then added camping articles to the range.

In 1968, Derksen purchased woodland near Reuver so staff and customers could relax in small tents. The park, was successful, and the tents were quickly replaced by bungalows. In 1987, Center Parcs opened its first UK resort at Sherwood Forest in Nottinghamshire. This brought the company into the sights of expanding brewer Scottish and Newcastle, which later bought the group.

In 2001, the UK locations separated from the continental Europe locations and formed a separate company, Center Parcs UK.

In 2003, Scottish & Newcastle sold the Continental European sites to a joint venture of Pierre & Vacances (P&V) and DBCP, a German investment group. This was given the name Center Parcs Europe (CPE). P&V owned Europe's largest (in terms of bed-count) bungalow-vacation-supplier, Gran Dorado Resorts, a Dutch former joint venture of Vendex, Algemeen Burgerlijk Pensioenfonds, GAK and Philips Rentefonds. P&V brought Gran Dorado in the joint venture.

As CPE was based in Rotterdam, Netherlands, the Dutch and European Commercial Competition Authority did not approve of combining Gran Dorado and Center Parcs, as it would effectively control the European market. After agreeing to a reduction in beds owned, CPE sold all but six Gran Dorado Resorts to Dutch Landal GreenParks. The remaining six parks were added to CenterParcs: Loohorst (NL), Port Zelande (NL), Zandvoort (NL), Weerterbergen (NL), Hochsauerland (D) and Heilbachsee (D).

After the sale, five of the six remaining Gran Dorado Resorts parks were rebranded Sea Spirit from Center Parcs or Free Life from Center Parcs. The Weerterbergen-Resort was sold to Roompot because of the cost of bringing it to standard. All original Center Parcs resorts in the Netherlands, France, Belgium and Germany were sub-branded CP Original. Having completed the integration and rebranding exercise, Pierre & Vacances bought DBCP out of the partnership.

In January 2009, Sunparks launched alongside Center Parcs in Europe, as a low-cost brand. Many of the former Gran Dorado resorts were rebranded in this exercise, but the sub brand was dropped in 2011 and the parks were rebranded to Center Parcs.

Operations and facilities
There are now 26 resorts in the Netherlands, France, Belgium and Germany. Most villages are different, but some villages such as Bispinger Heide in Germany and Domaine Les Bois Francs in France (and many more) share the same Village Plaza design. They have the same styled Aqua Mundo and Sports Plaza. Accommodation is in villas or bungalows, clustered in a park and surrounded by trees and bushes. An exception is Park Zandvoort, set among sand dunes. Certain resorts also provide hotel rooms. The first village had features that have stayed popular like the swimming pool, shops and restaurants. The first dome arrived in 1980, named Subtropical Swimming Paradise in UK resorts and Aqua Mundo in European resorts. A range of sporting activities is available, with restaurants, spas, saunas, and massage.

In 2009, Center Parcs Europe divided its parks into two brands: "Center Parcs", which includes the 5-star parks, and "Sunparks", which includes the 3- or 4-star parks. At the beginning of 2011 the company decided to rename most Sunparks as Center Parcs.

All resorts
Center Parcs Europe owns 26 Center Parcs resorts and 2 Sunparks resorts.

See also
Tropical Islands Resort - another large European indoor sub-tropical leisure village

References

Hotel chains in the Netherlands
Center Parcs
The Blackstone Group
Hotels established in 1968
Hospitality companies of the Netherlands